Stenopsocidae is a family of Psocoptera belonging to the suborder Psocomorpha, in the infraorder Caeciliusetae. Member of this family have an areola postica connected to the M vein by a crossvein. The family is composed of about 100 species.

References
Lienhard, C. & Smithers, C. N. 2002. Psocoptera (Insecta): World Catalogue and Bibliography. Instrumenta Biodiversitatis, vol. 5. Muséum d'histoire naturelle, Genève.

 
Psocoptera families